Titane is a 2021 French body-horror film by Julia Ducournau.

Titane may also refer to:

 Titane (Sicyon), a city in ancient Greece
 Titani, a village (in modern-day Greece) 
 Titanium(IV) hydride, a chemical compound
 Titans in Greek mythology